Jack Standing (10 February 1886 – 25 October 1917) was an English born American actor.

Biography
The son of stage actor Herbert Standing and brother of Wyndham Standing (1880–1963), who also was a famous actor in the early days of film, Jack Standing first appeared in Broadway musicals such as The Belle of New York and Florodora before he went to the Biograph Company in 1909. Because he was a handsome young man, he was quickly offered many roles and signed a contract with Sigmund Lubin in 1911. Like many others from the silent film, Standing was asked to play quite everything from passionate lovers to villains or old men. In 1915, he told the Moving Picture World magazine, "Spare me from being a one-type actor!" He appeared in more than fifty films. An incomplete print of 1915 Mary Pickford vehicle Fanchon the Cricket, in which Standing co-starred, has recently been found. The teenage Fred and Adele Astaire allegedly made their screen debuts in this film. Standing's greatest success was the 1916 film Hell's Hinges, where he played the weak-willed brother of Clara Williams.

On 25 October 1917, Standing died of pneumonia at the age of 31, bringing a premature end to a promising career.

Standing married and had a son, Jack Standing Jr. (born 1914) who apparently appeared in early silent films as a child.

Many members of his family also worked in the theatre or films, including his father Herbert Standing (1846-1923) and brothers Wyndham, Herbert Jr., Sir Guy and Percy, as well as Herbert Jr.'s daughter Joan Standing and Sir Guy's daughter Kay Hammond.

Filmography

References

External links

Standing family at ThePeerage

1886 births
1917 deaths
English male film actors
English male silent film actors
Male actors from London
20th-century English male actors
Deaths from pneumonia in California
Standing family
British expatriate male actors in the United States